Tirone José González Orama (March 11, 1988 – January 20, 2015), known by his stage name Canserbero, was a Venezuelan hip hop singer and songwriter from Caracas. He was widely regarded as the best rapper in Latin America.

Since he was young, he showed interest in music, mainly influenced by reggaeton but, after the murder of his half brother, his musical references changed to more critical genres such as hip hop and hard rock, appreciable in songs like "Es épico".

Canserbero, throughout his career, released two studio albums as a soloist, Vida (2010) and Muerte (2012) respectively, and had several notorious songs such as "Pensando en ti", "Es épico", "C'est la mort", "Maquiavélico", among others. He also participated as a vocalist in several songs of artists from Latin America and Spain as Mala Rodríguez, with whom he recorded a song entitled "Ella" (2013). In January 2015, Canserbero was found dead after having fallen from an apartment in Maracay. There are several hypotheses about his death.

Career
At the age of eleven, he began performing rap performances under the stage name of Canserbero a jargon of Latinism cerbero dog (in Latin, canis cerberus) meaning "guardian", an allusion to Cerberus of Greek mythology.

Personal life
He was born on March 11, 1988, in the General Hospital of Lídice Dr. Jesús Yerena of the city of Caracas, as Tirone José González Oramas. He was the son of José Rafael González Ollarves and Leticia Coromoto Oramas. Later, his parents moved with him to Maracay. In 1997, his mother died and was left under the care of his father.

Death
Canserbero died in an apparent murder–suicide on January 20, 2015, in Maracay.

On January 20, 2015, Canserbero was found dead in front of his apartment. The artist was found from the tenth floor of the Camino Real building in the Andrés Bello urbanization in Maracay. Initially, some of his close friends maintained that the artist stayed in the apartment of bassist Carlos Molnar, a friend and co-worker, since he had schizophrenia. Molnar was killed that same day by stabbing. On the other hand, the Ombudsman of Venezuela, Tarek William Saab, in March of the same year, reopened the case, since there were other additional details that straighten some hypotheses of the "witnesses". The first hypothesis is based on the fact that the kitchen window was made of romanillas and all the glasses were previously removed, which causes intrigue, given the "presumed" psychotic state in which Canserbero was used at the time of launching. [Quote required] "Having taken the romanillas out of the window indicates method, not despair," says the defender, who relies on the sisters' testimony to indicate that the romanillas were not at the time of Canserbero's fall, "but someone put them back later", he said.

While depressed (although family members stated that he did not have any mental illness), he was asked by Carlos Molnar, bassist for Zion TPL, to stay with him.

Allegedly, Canserbero stabbed Molnar to death and then jumped to his own death from the tenth floor of the building. However, several members of his family have expressed several doubts regarding the police investigation.

Discography

Studio albums
 2008 – Can + Zoo Indigos
 2009 – Guia Para La Accion
 2010 – Vida
 2012 – Muerte
 2013 – Apa y Can
 2015 – Give Me 5

References

External links
 Website in memoriam
 Caserbero Quotes

1988 births
People with mood disorders
Hip hop singers
2015 deaths
Rap rock musicians
Musicians from Caracas
Unsolved deaths
Deaths from falls
21st-century Venezuelan male singers